Francisco Rodríguez Araya (born 8 February 1995) is a Swiss professional footballer who plays as a midfielder for Winterthur. His older brothers are the Swiss international Ricardo Rodríguez and the winger Roberto Rodríguez.

Club career

FC Zürich
Rodríguez is a youth exponent from FC Zürich. He made his Swiss Super League debut on 20 July 2014 in the derby  against Grasshopper Club Zürich, playing the entirety of a 1–0 win.

VfL Wolfsburg
After a year with his first senior side, Rodríguez joined his brother Ricardo at German side VfL Wolfsburg signing a three-year-contract until 2018. The transfer fee was believed to be €1.6 million. He received his first call for the senior team on 26 September 2015, when he was an unused substitute in a Bundesliga match versus Hannover 96.

He was loaned to Arminia Bielefeld on 22 January 2016. On 31 August 2016, the loan deal with Bielefeld was terminated and Rodríguez joined FC Luzern.

FC Luzern
In June 2017, it was confirmed that Rodriguez had transferred to FC Luzern for an undisclosed fee.

International career
Rodríguez is a Swiss under-19 international who is eligible to play for Chile or Spain through his parents' nationality. On 18 August 2014, manager Jorge Sampaoli called Rodríguez to play for Chile in two friendlies against Mexico and Haiti, and he was set to make his full international debut. But on 21 August 2015, he refused the call up to the senior squad for a match against Paraguay, saying that he still preferred to play for Switzerland's U21 team.

References

Living people
1995 births
Association football midfielders
Swiss men's footballers
Switzerland under-21 international footballers
Switzerland youth international footballers
Swiss Super League players
Bundesliga players
2. Bundesliga players
Swiss Challenge League players
Swiss Promotion League players
FC Zürich players
VfL Wolfsburg II players
Arminia Bielefeld players
FC Luzern players
FC Lugano players
FC Schaffhausen players
FC Winterthur players
Swiss expatriate footballers
Expatriate footballers in Germany
Swiss people of Basque descent
Swiss people of Spanish descent
Swiss people of Chilean descent
Swiss people of Galician descent
Sportspeople of Spanish descent
Sportspeople of Chilean descent
Footballers from Zürich